Emm Gryner (born 8 June 1975 in Sarnia, Ontario) is a Canadian-Filipino singer, songwriter, recording artist, and author.  She has released 20 albums as a solo performer, and has collaborated with artists including David Bowie and Chris Hadfield.

Early life 
Gryner's childhood was spent in Forest, Ontario. Her father was of half Irish heritage and her mother was Filipina.  She started to learn piano at age 4, picked up bass around age 14, and later took up guitar as well.

Gryner attended North Lambton Secondary School in Forest, Ontario. Following high school, she graduated from Fanshawe College's Music Industry Arts program in 1995.

Gryner has two brothers, Tony and record producer and musician Frank.

Career 
Gryner started her music career in Toronto, where her original song "Wisdom Bus" won a nationwide songwriting contest sponsored by Standard Broadcasting. With the prize money, she recorded an album called The Original Leap Year and released it on her own Dead Daisy Records. The album attracted the attention of Mercury Records, who signed Gryner to a recording contract.

Gryner's first release on Mercury was 1998's Public, a Britpop-inspired album that yielded a Canadian hit called "Summerlong."  She was nominated for the Best New Solo Artist Juno Award in 1999.

Bowie Band 

Also in 1999, Gryner was asked to join David Bowie’s band as a backup singer and keyboard player. The gig saw Gryner performing with Bowie at Glastonbury Festival, on Later with Jools Holland, Saturday Night Live, and other venues around America and Europe. She appears on the live albums Glastonbury 2000 and Bowie at the Beeb, as well as Toy.

Solo career 

After Universal Music took over Mercury Records, Gryner returned to her Dead Daisy Records label, releasing several albums, including Girl Versions and Asianblue, which were both nominated for Pop Album of the Year at the Juno Awards.

Gryner released Songs of Love and Death, an album of cover versions of Irish songs, in 2005.  The album attracted the attention of Irish media, and Gryner appeared on programs like The Late Late Show during her subsequent tour of Ireland.

Between 2006 and 2020 Gryner released 11 albums, 4 EPs, and a "Best of" compilation with two unreleased tracks.  The Summer of High Hopes, produced by Nathan Larson, was released in Canada and later in Ireland on the heels of a performance at Oxegen Festival; The Irish Times' Siobhàn Long said it was "the distilled voice of an original".  In the November 2006 issue of Q, U2 frontman Bono recognized the track "Almighty Love" as one of six songs that he wished he had written from the last twenty years of music.

Her 2014 album Torrential was called "superb pop" by The Irish Times' Tony Clayton-Lea.

During the COVID-19 pandemic Gryner released the singles "Stronger Someone", in support of Bluewater Health Foundation, and "All Love All The Time" with Rob Wells, as well as the album Just For You, a collection of jazz standards.

Space Oddity in space 

In May 2013, Gryner arranged and performed piano on astronaut Chris Hadfield's cover version of David Bowie's "Space Oddity". The music video for the song features Hadfield on the International Space Station and is considered the first ever filmed in space.

Fanshawe College presents an annual Emm Gryner and Chris Hadfield Music Industry Arts Award to a Year 2 student in the School of Contemporary Media who demonstrates "a keen interest [...] in the creative and technical aspects of the music industry [and] leadership characteristics with respect to his or her classmates, faculty and staff, as well as exceptional creativity and dedication".

Other collaborations 

Gryner collaborated with Larson in the band Hot One and appeared on the group's self-titled album in 2006.

She is also a member of the collective The Cake Sale, along with Gary Lightbody of Snow Patrol, Bell X1, Josh Ritter and Glen Hansard. The collective is featured on The Cake Sale, a multi-platinum-selling Irish album with proceeds to Oxfam’s Make Trade Fair.

In 2011 Gryner formed Trent Severn with Dayna Manning and Laura C. Bates.  Their debut self-titled album was released on Gryner's Dead Daisy Records label in 2012, followed by Trillium (2015) and Portage (2017).

In 2014, Gryner assembled the band Trapper with Sean Kelly (on guitar), brother Frank Gryner (on guitar), Jordan Kern (on bass) and Tim Timleck (ex-Universal Honey on drums), playing "1980s-style melodic hard rock." In May 2015, Trapper opened for Brit-rockers Def Leppard on 3 Canadian tour dates in Montréal, Ottawa and London, Ontario.  Gryner had met and become friends with Def Leppard lead singer Joe Elliott when she toured as a backing singer with David Bowie.

Other work 

In 2008 Gryner acted and sang in One Week, a film by director Michael McGowan.  In the film she sings Un Canadien errant; she also contributed her song "Blackwinged Bird" to the soundtrack.

In the summers of 2007 and 2008, Gryner and Danny Michel co-hosted Under the Covers, a radio show about cover songs, on CBC Radio One.

In October 2016 Gryner starred in Joni Mitchell: River at the Grand Theatre in London, Ontario along with Louise Pitre and Brendan Wall.  The play and performers met with positive reviews: in the London Free Press Joe Belanger commented that "her vocal range, the emotional qualities of her voice and its sound [are] like a touchstone to Mitchell throughout," and Mary Alderson wrote that "she is stunning in her a capella numbers."

In September 2021 ECW Press released Gryner's book The Healing Power of Singing: Raise Your Voice, Change Your Life (What Touring with David Bowie, Single Parenting and Ditching the Music Business Taught Me in 25 Easy Steps), described as "part study in the art of singing, part guide to finding one's voice, and part memoir." The book became an Amazon bestseller in 2022.

Dead Daisy Records 

Gryner's label, Dead Daisy Records, also released the debut records for Atlantic Canadian indie band In-Flight Safety, Daniel Ledwell, Andrew Spice, Cicero, and Toronto songwriter Royal Wood.

Discography
 And Distrust It (1995)
 The Original Leap Year (1997)
 Public (1998)
 Science Fair (1999)
 Dead Relatives (2000)
 Girl Versions (2001)
 The Winter (EP) (2002)
 Asianblue (2002)
 Songs of Love and Death (2005)
 The Great Lakes (2005)
 The Summer of High Hopes (2006)
 PVT (2006) (originally issued as a bonus disc with The Summer of High Hopes, later sold separately)
 Goddess (2009)
 Stray Bullets EP (2010)
 Gem and I (2010)
 Northern Gospel (2011)
 She's Gone: A Hall & Oates Tribute EP (2012)
 The Best of Emm Gryner (2012)
 FrostPop (EP) (2013)
 Torrential (2014)
 21st Century Ballads (2015)
 Calmphonic (2016)
 Aonarán (2016)
 Slant (EP) (2017)
 Only of Earth: Days of Games (2017)
 Just for You (2020)
 Business & Pleasure (2023)

References

External links
 
 

1975 births
Living people
Canadian pop guitarists
Canadian pop pianists
Canadian women singer-songwriters
Canadian women guitarists
Canadian people of Irish descent
Musicians from Ontario
People from Sarnia
Fanshawe College alumni
Canadian musicians of Filipino descent
Women bass guitarists
Canadian women pop singers
20th-century Canadian women singers
21st-century Canadian women singers
21st-century Canadian pianists
21st-century Canadian bass guitarists
Second Motion Records artists
20th-century women pianists
21st-century women pianists